The 1968–69 Alpha Ethniki was the 33rd season of the highest football league of Greece. The season began on 22 September 1968 and ended on 15 June 1969. Panathinaikos won their ninth Greek title and their first one in three years.

The point system was: Win: 3 points - Draw: 2 points - Loss: 1 point.

League table

Results

|+Relegation play-offs

|}

*Proodeftiki won on flip of a coin.

Top scorers

External links
Greek Wikipedia
Official Greek FA Site
Greek SuperLeague official Site
SuperLeague Statistics

Alpha Ethniki seasons
Greece
1968–69 in Greek football leagues